IGCP may refer to
International Geoscience Programme, an organization that facilitates research cooperation among geoscientists 
International Gorilla Conservation Programme, formed in 1991 to ensure that the critically endangered mountain gorillas are conserved